Jenna Anne Hellstrom (born April 2, 1995) is a Canadian former professional soccer player who last played as a forward for Dijon FCO in the Division 1 Féminine and the Canada women's national team.

College career
Hellstrom attended Kent State University, where she played for the Golden Flashes from 2013 to 2016. As a freshman, she was named MAC Freshman of the Year after scoring five goals and recording five assists in 16 appearances. During her second year, she started in all 20 games and finished the season as the leading scorer on the team with seven goals, including three game-winners, and six assists. As a junior, she scored eleven goals and recorded twelve assists in 20 appearances. As a senior, she led the MAC in assists (10) and points (38), while ranking second in goals scored (14). She became the first NSCAA All-American in program history after leading the team to its first-ever Mid-American Conference Tournament (MAC) championship. Hellstrom is Kent State's all-time leader in 12 different career and single-season categories, including goals (37), assists (33), game-winning goals (17) and points (107). Hellstrom graduated with a degree in Sports Administration and Business.

Club career

FC Rosengård
Following a stint with Motor City FC of the WPSL, Hellstrom was named to the FC Kansas City preseason roster for the 2017 NWSL season. After being released, she left the United States and on July 4, 2017 she signed a short-term contract with FC Rosengård, who had first expressed interest in Hellstrom in the summer of 2016, when she spent three weeks training with the club. On August 19, 2017, she made her debut in a 1–0 win over Eskilstuna United DFF. On August 27, 2017, she won her first trophy as Rosengård defeated Linköpings FC in the Svenska Cupen final. After a few matches she remarked that the game differed significantly from what she was used to during college in North America, where the focus was only on attacking. Now in Rosengård there was a lot more controlling, going sideways and tactics, which she saw as relaxed.

On November 15, 2017, she made her UEFA Women's Champions League debut in a 1–0 loss to Chelsea. Hellstrom made a total of 9 appearances for Rosengård in all competitions.

Djurgårdens IF
In December 2017, Hellstrom joined Djurgårdens IF. On February 10, 2018, she made her debut in a 2–0 home victory against Hammarby in Svenska Cupen. On March 18, 2018, she scored her first goal in a 2–1 loss to Rosengård in the Svenska Cupen.

Växjö DFF
On August 14, 2018, Hellstrom signed with Växjö DFF. On August 26, 2018, she made her debut in a 2–1 win over Vittsjö GIK. On September 8, 2018, she scored her first goal in a 3–2 victory against IFK Kalmar. She made a total of 7 appearances for the side, scoring three goals.

KIF Örebro
On December 5, 2018, Hellstrom signed a one-year contract with KIF Örebro for the 2019 season.

On July 31, Hellstrom scored 2 goals in a 3–1 win over Djurgården. It would turn out to be her only goals that season, nevertheless it was a successful season for her.

Washington Spirit
In December 2019, Jenna Hellstrom signed with the Washington Spirit in the NWSL. The length of the contract was not announced per league policy. Due to the COVID-19 pandemic the originally planned league was cancelled. There was later played a compressed cup and series, the 2020 Challenge Cup and the Fall Series respectively.

Return to KIF Örebro
On 29 December 2020 KIF Örebro announced that Jenna Hellstrom would return to the club for the 2021 season. She expressed joy over returning to Örebro and Sweden, saying it has become her second home after the years in Sweden, was really looking forward to it, and had fond memories of the 2019 season as it went well for her then and led to her being selected to the national team squad for the 2019 FIFA Women's World Cup.

Dijon FCO
On 15 July 2022, Hellstrom signed a two-year contract with Dijon FCO.

Retirement
Hellstrom announced her retirement on 27 February 2023.

International career
In July 2010, Hellstrom was called up to the under-15 national team for a training camp in the United States. In November 2017, she received her first senior call-up. On March 5, 2018, she made her debut for Canada in a 3–0 win over South Korea in the 2018 Algarve Cup. On May 25, 2019 she was named to the roster for the 2019 FIFA Women's World Cup.

In May 2021 she said she hoped that her good performance in KIF Örebro during the spring would lead her to being selected for the national team squad to the 2020 Olympics. However, she was not selected for the final 22-player roster.

Career statistics

Club

Honours

Club
FC Rosengård
Svenska Cupen:

References

External links
Jenna Hellstrom at Kent State University
Jenna Hellstrom at Djurgårdens IF

Jenna Hellstrom at Soccerway

Social media
Instagram
Twitter

1995 births
Canadian women's soccer players
Canada women's international soccer players
Living people
Soccer people from Ontario
Sportspeople from Greater Sudbury
Women's association football forwards
Växjö DFF players
FC Rosengård players
Djurgårdens IF Fotboll (women) players
KIF Örebro DFF players
Damallsvenskan players
Canadian expatriate women's soccer players
Expatriate women's footballers in Sweden
2019 FIFA Women's World Cup players
Kent State Golden Flashes women's soccer players
Washington Spirit players
National Women's Soccer League players
Canadian people of Finnish descent
Canadian expatriate sportspeople in Sweden
Canadian expatriate sportspeople in France
Expatriate women's footballers in France
Dijon FCO (women) players
Division 1 Féminine players